"Turn It Up" is the third single from English rock band the Feeling's second album, Join with Us (2008). It was confirmed on 16 May 2008 on the band's official website that it would be released digitally on 30 June, with the CD out on 7 July. The single's format details were revealed on the Feeling's website on 29 May 2008. Included are the single itself, a new song, a cover version of Velvet Underground's "Femme Fatale" and two remixes of "Turn It Up".

Upon its release, the song peaked at number 67 on the UK Singles Chart, becoming their second-lowest-charting single. The band performed "Turn It Up" on The Graham Norton Show on 5 June 2008 and on The Sunday Night Project on 6 July 2008.

Music video
The video was filmed in London on 27 May 2008, and features some of the band's fans, after a competition was run on their website. It premiered on Channel 4's website on 9 June, although it had been played on some music television channels earlier. It was edited in Soho, London at several post production facilities including Locomotion and Rushes.

Track listings
UK CD single and digital download
 "Turn It Up" – 3:52
 "Make Me Pay" – 4:20
 "Femme Fatale" (Velvet Underground cover) – 2:38
 "Turn It Up" (Alex Gaudino remix) – 7:11
 "Turn It Up" (Me and Mrs Jones remix) – 5:42

UK 7-inch Coke bottle clear vinyl single
A. "Turn It Up"
B. "Make Me Pay"

Charts

References

The Feeling songs
2008 songs
Island Records singles
Songs written by Ciaran Jeremiah
Songs written by Dan Gillespie Sells
Songs written by Kevin Jeremiah
Songs written by Paul Stewart (musician)
Songs written by Richard Jones (The Feeling)
Universal Records singles